The Missing Truth is a 2019 Burmese thriller drama series starring May Myint Mo, Naw Phaw Eh Htar, Lu Min, Aung Ye Htike, Kaung Myat San and Htoo Aung. It aired on MRTV-4 from September 19 to October 16, 2019, on Mondays to Fridays at 19:00 for 20 episodes.

The series is directed by Kaung Zan and produced by Taraus V Production, held premiere show on September 14, 2019 in Junction City JCGV, Yangon. It was also banned from watching series under the age of 13.

Synopsis 
It's about a father's unconditional and imprudent love for his children. U Phone Myint Htet  can provide strongest foundation for physical  development yet lack in mental support which leads to his youngest son Zwe Htet's inferiority and unintended crimes. Thudra was starring as a ghost who seeks revenge for vengeance which based on her family massacre. Since she is addicted to social media, after being killed by one of her fans, she started to killed everyone who included in the death of her and her family!

Cast

Main
 May Myint Mo as May Htet Cho
 Naw Phaw Eh Htar as Thudra
 Lu Min as U Phone Myint Htet
 Aung Ye Htike as Zwe Htet
 Htoo Aung as Kaung Htet
 Kaung Myat San as Nay Lin Thit

Supporting
 Thun Thitsar Zaw as Shwe Khat
Aung Khant Hmue as Min Naing
Soe Pyay Myint as Naung Naung
La Pyae as Wai Yan

References

Burmese television series
MRTV (TV network) original programming